The 2004–05 Milwaukee Panthers men's basketball team represented the University of Wisconsin–Milwaukee during the 2004–05 NCAA Division I men's basketball season. The Panthers, led by head coach Bruce Pearl, played their home games at the U.S. Cellular Arena and Klotsche Center and were members of the Horizon League. They finished the season 26–6, 14–2 in Horizon League play to finish in first place. They were champions of the Horizon League tournament to earn an automatic bid to the NCAA tournament where they received a #12 seed and defeated No. 5 seed Alabama and No. 4 seed Boston College to reach their 1st Sweet 16 in school history. Their season ended after losing to the eventual National runner-up and No. 1 overall seed Illinois.

Roster

Schedule and results 

|-
!colspan=9 style=| Exhibition

|-
!colspan=9 style=| Regular season

|-
!colspan=9 style=| Horizon League Tournament

|-
!colspan=9 style=| NCAA Tournament

2005 Horizon League Tournament 

First round games at campus sites of higher seeds
Second round and semifinals hosted by the top seed.
Championship hosted by best remaining seed

Rankings

Awards and honors
Ed McCants – Horizon League Player of the Year
Bruce Pearl – Horizon League Coach of the Year

References 

 2004-05 Milwaukee Panthers Schedule and Results

Milwaukee
Milwaukee Panthers men's basketball seasons
Milwaukee